Si Khvoran-e Bala (also Romanized as Sī Khvorān-e Bālā; also known as Sīkharān-e Bālā, Sīkharān-e ‘Oleyā, Sīkhorān-e ‘Olyā, and Sīkhūrān-e ‘Olyā) is a village in Siyahu Rural District, Fin District, Bandar Abbas County, Hormozgan Province, Iran. At the 2006 census, its population was 88, in 23 families.

References 

Populated places in Bandar Abbas County